Prague underground was an underground culture developed in Prague, Czechoslovakia in the late 1960s and 1970s during the Normalization period. The movement was characterized by resistance against conformity, conventions, and consumerism. Because of its non-conformity, it had serious problems with the communist regime which considered it as a political opposition.
It was mainly expressed with experimental rock, art rock and psychedelic rock music (The Plastic People of the Universe, DG 307) and samizdat literature, partially inspired by the culture scene around Andy Warhol and The Velvet Underground. The unofficial leader of this commune was art-historian and poet Ivan Martin Jirous. He designated the status of the community as a parallel world independent on the mainstream regime. Although being imprisoned many times, he never gave up on leading role in the movement. Among the fans of this subculture was, for example, former Czech President Václav Havel. This friendship led to the creation of Charter 77, which was sparked by the imprisonment of Jirous and The Plastic People of the Universe.

See also
Mánička
Prague Spring

External links
  Prague Underground

Prague Underground
Culture in Prague
Underground culture
Prague Underground
Counterculture of the 1960s
Czechoslovak Socialist Republic
Czech youth culture